Ivano-Frankivsk, formerly Stanyslaviv and Stanislav, is a city in western Ukraine. It is the administrative centre of Ivano-Frankivsk Oblast and Ivano-Frankivsk Raion. Ivano-Frankivsk hosts the administration of Ivano-Frankivsk urban hromada. Its population is 

Built in the mid-17th century as a fortress of the Polish Potocki family, Stanisławów was annexed to the Habsburg Empire during the First Partition of Poland in 1772, after which it became the property of the State within the Austrian Empire. The fortress was slowly transformed into one of the most prominent cities at the foothills of the Carpathian Mountains. After World War I, for several months, it served as a temporary capital of the West Ukrainian People's Republic. Following the Peace of Riga in 1921, Stanisławów became part of the Second Polish Republic. After the Soviet invasion of Poland at the onset of World War II, the city was annexed by the Soviet Union, only to be occupied by Nazi Germany two years later. With the liberation of Soviet Ukraine in 1944 and the shifting of borders, the city remained part of the Ukrainian SSR and was renamed in 1962 after Ivan Franko. With the fall of the Soviet Union in 1991, the city become part of the newly independent Ukraine.

Ivano-Frankivsk is one of the principal cities of the Carpathian Euroregion. There are elements of various cultures intertwined in the city's architecture, including the Polish city hall, the Austro-Hungarian city's business centre, the Soviet prefabricated apartment blocks at the city's rural–urban fringe, and others.

Name

The town was founded as a fortress known as Stanisławów where it was named after the Polish hetman Stanisław "Rewera" Potocki. Some sources claim it was named after his grandson Stanisław. Following the First Partition of Poland in 1772, the name was transliterated as Stanislau in German, as the city became part of the Austrian Empire, and later Austria-Hungary; however, after the Revolutions of 1848, the city carried three different linguistic renderings of its name: German, Polish, and Ruthenian (Stanislaviv, or  Stanyslaviv).

After World War II it was changed by the Soviet authorities into a simplified version Stanislav. In 1962, to honor the Ukrainian writer Ivan Franko on the city's 300th anniversary, it was renamed Ivano-Frankivsk or Ivano-Frankovsk. It is sometimes colloquially called  Franyk by its residents.

History

The town of Stanisławów was founded as a fortress in order to protect the Polish–Lithuanian Commonwealth from Tatar invasions and to defend the multi-ethnic population of the region in case of armed conflicts such as the Khmelnytsky Uprising of 1648. The fort was originally built next to Zabolotiv village (known since 1435), and Knyahynyn (1449). The village of Zabolotiv and the land around it were purchased by Andrzej Potocki from another Polish nobleman, Rzeczkowski. Stanisławów was issued by Potocki and his declaration establishing the city with Magdeburg rights on May 7, 1662; but the city and its rights, however, were not recognized by the Polish Crown until August 14, 1663, when John Casimir had finally approved it. By 1672, the fortress had been rebuilt from wood to stone, brick, and mortar. Also a new large fortified Potocki palace was erected in the place of an older wood structure. Today this building serves as the military hospital. In the same year Jews were granted the right to become permanent residents, who could work, conduct commerce and travel in and out of the city as they pleased.

Originally the city was divided into two districts: Tysmenytsia and Halych. Sometime in 1817–1819 the neighbouring village of Zabolottya, that had a special status, was incorporated into the city as a new district, while Tysmenytsia district was divided into Tysmenytsia and Lysets districts. Each district had its main street corresponded with its name: Halych Street (Halych district), Tysmenytsia Street which today is Independence Street (Tysmenytsia district), Zabolotiv Street – Mykhailo Hrushevsky Street and Street of Vasylyanok (Zabolottya district), and Lysets Street – Hetman Mazepa Street (Lysets district). Later the city was split into six small districts: midtown where the rich Catholic population and patricians lived, pidzamche (subcastle), and four suburbs – Zabolotiv, Tysmenytsia, Halych and Lysets where the plebeians lived.

In October 1918, the Austro-Hungarian Empire collapsed and the Western Ukrainian People's Republic (ZUNR) was proclaimed. In the early months of 1919 (from January to May) the city became a temporary capital of the West Ukrainian National Republic, while still recovering from World War I. All state affairs took place in the building of Dnister Hotel where the Act Zluky (Unification Act) was composed and signed on January 22, 1919 by the Ukrainian People's Republic.  The same year it was subjected to the Polish–Ukrainian and the Romanian-Ukrainian skirmishes eventually being annexed by Poland as part of the Second Polish Republic as the centre of the Stanisławów Voivodeship. It was occupied by the Romanian army for the summer months from May 25 through August 21, 1919. During the Polish–Soviet War in 1920, the Red Army took over the city for a brief period. After the Soviet retreat, Ukrainian troops loyal to Symon Petlura occupied the city for a few days. At this period of history the city was in complete disorder. It then became part of Poland until the start of World War II.

In the 1939 invasion of Poland by German and Soviet forces, the territory was captured by the Soviets in September 1939 and annexed to the Ukrainian SSR. Between September 1939 and June 1941, the Soviet regime ordered thousands of inhabitants of the city to leave their houses and move to Siberia, where most of them perished. Numerous people were taken out of the city prison and simply shot outside of the city when Soviet forces were leaving it in 1941. Ivano-Frankivsk was occupied by German forces from July 2, 1941 to July 27, 1944. There were more than 40,000 Jews in Stanisławów when it was occupied by the Nazi Germany on July 26, 1941. The Stanisławów Ghetto was formed. During the occupation (1941–44), more than 600 educated Poles and most of the city's Jewish population were murdered.

In early 1944, the city became part of the Soviet Union and was again renamed Stanislav. The Soviets forced most of the Polish population to leave the city, where most of them settled in the Recovered Territories. In 1962, the city was renamed Ivano-Frankivsk after the Ukrainian writer Ivan Franko.

During the post-war period, the city was part of the Carpathian Military District housing the 38th Army (70th Motor Rifle Division) that participated in Warsaw Pact invasion of Czechoslovakia.

Until 18 July 2020, Ivano-Frankivsk was incorporated as a city of oblast significance and the center of Ivano-Frankivsk Municipality. The municipality was abolished in July 2020 as part of the administrative reform of Ukraine, which reduced the number of raions of Ivano-Frankivsk Oblast to six. The area of Ivano-Frankivsk Municipality was merged into the newly established Ivano-Frankivsk Raion.

On 24 February and 11 March 2022, Ivano-Frankivsk was struck by Russian missiles during the 2022 Russian invasion of Ukraine. See 2022 bombing of Ivano-Frankivsk.

Timeline

 1650–1662: establishing a private fortress of Potocki
 1662–1772: Stanisławów, Polish–Lithuanian Commonwealth (within the Kingdom of Poland),
 1772–1815: Stanisławów (Stanislau), Austrian Monarchy (within the Kingdom of Galicia and Lodomeria),
 1815–1918: Stanisławów (Stanislau), Austrian Empire, then Austria-Hungary,
 November 1918 – May 1919: Stanyslaviv, West Ukrainian People's Republic,
 May 1919 – September 1939: Stanisławów, Poland, seat of the Stanisławów Voivodeship,
 October 1939 – June 1941: Stanyslaviv, Ukrainian Soviet Socialist Republic,
 July 1941 – August 1944: Stanisławów (Stanislau), seat of the Stanislau Kreis, District of Galicia, General Government,
 August 1944 – November 9, 1962: Stanislav,
 November 9, 1962: renamed as Ivano-Frankivsk, oblast seat, Ukrainian SSR,
 1991–present: Ivano-Frankivsk, independent Ukraine

Environment

Geography 
One of the several main geographical features is the Vovchynets Hill also known as the Vovchynets Mountains. The hill reaches 300- above sea level and is part of the Pokuttya Highland (Upland). Around the hill Bystrytsia River branches into Bystrytsia of Nadvirna, Bystrytsia of Solotvyn, and Vorona. The last two rivers serve as a natural border between the Pokuttya Highland and Stanislav Basin. The Vovchynets Hill is located just outside and northeast of Ivano-Frankivsk. Located southeast from the Stanislav Basin in the direction of the Prut Valley is the Khorosnen (Prut-Bystrytsia) Highland. The highest point of that highland is Mount Hostra, .

The city also administers five adjacent villages that surround it: Mykytyntsi, Krykhivtsi, Vovchynets, Uhornyky, and Khryplyn.

Climate 
As is the case with most of Ukraine, the climate is moderate continental with warm summers, and fairly cold winters. The following climate data provided is for the past 62 years. The average number of days with precipitation is 170 spread almost equally throughout a year. Most precipitation takes place during the winter months and least – early fall. Thunderstorms occur mostly in summer months averaging around 25 annually. Ivano-Frankivsk averages about 296 days of fog or misty days with about 24 per month.

Demographics

Note: Historical population record is taken out of Ivano-Frankivsk portal, more recent – the Regional Directorate of Statistics. There is also other information on a population growth such as the JewishGen. With asterisk there are identified years of approximate data. In the 18th century, differentiation among Poles and Ukrainians was by religious background rather than ethnic (Catholics vs. Orthodox).

Administration
Both city and oblast administrations as well as the regional council are all located in a massive white building on Hrushevsky Street locally known as Bily Dim or Bily Budynok. In front of the building, there is a big open space bordered by Shpytalna Street on the north-east, Hrushevsky Street on the south-east, and Melnychuk Street on the south-west. Next to the building, there is a memorial to the Unification of the Western Ukraine with the rest of Ukraine. The main feature of the memorial is a tall marble stele, both sides of which are adorned with statues: kamenyar (west) and kobzar (east).

City Council
The city council currently consists of 42 deputies. The political representation after the 2020 Ukrainian local elections by political blocs was elected as such: 28 seats for Svoboda, 10 seats for European Solidarity and 4 seats for Batkivschyna.

Recent city mayors

 Bohdan Borovych (OUN) July 1994 – June 1998
 Zinoviy Shkutiak (Our Ukraine) March 1998 – 26 March 2006
 Viktor Anushkevychus (UPP) 26 March 2006 – 2015 
  (All-Ukrainian Union «Svoboda») 2015–2023
  (All-Ukrainian Union «Svoboda») 2023–present

In the (first round of the) 2020 Ukrainian local elections Martsinkiv was reelected with about 85% of the vote.

Streets

All street names reflecting the city's Soviet or Russian past have been returned to their former names, or given new names of national historic importance, or other non-controversial names. For example, Gagarin Street (connecting the city with its suburbs) became Vovchynets Street, Suvorov Street is now Harbar Street, and Soviet Street is Independence Street.

Around 100 other streets were renamed.
 Important transportation arteries
 Independence Street (vulytsya Nezalezhnosti) / Tysmenytsya Road (doroha Tysmenetska)
 Halych Road (vulytsya Halytska)
 Hetman Mazepa Street (vulytsya Hetmana Mazepy) / Krykhivtsi Road (doroha Krykhivetska)
 Yevhen Konovalets Road (vulytsya Yevhena Konovaltsya)
 Vovchynets Street (vulytsya Vovchynetska)
 Vasyl Stefanyk Shore Drive (naberezhna Vasylya Stefanyka)

City squares
The city has seven main city squares, four of them located in the "old town" part of the city.
 Viche Maidan
 Market Square
 Sheptytsky Square
 Pryvokzalna Square
 Mickiewicz Square (Mickiewicz Park)
 Liberation Square
 European Square

Rural-urban fringe districts
Like a lot of regional centers in Ukraine and the former Soviet Union, Ivano-Frankivsk is well known for its rural-urban fringe panel building residential districts, too.
 BAM
 Kaskad
 Positron
 Budivelnykiv

Transport

 Public transportation
The city of Ivano-Frankivsk has an extensive network of public transport including buses, trolleybuses, and taxis. There are nine trolleybus routes and about 52 for regular buses. Some of the routes run beyond the city into nearby villages.

 Railway transportation
The city is served by the Ivano-Frankivsk railway station. There are also smaller railway stations in adjacent villages, including Uhryniv and Khryplyn. All of them are part of Lviv Railways.

 Bus transportation
Until 2008, the railway terminal also housed a bus terminal which provided several inter-city bus routes, including some to international destinations. In 2000, construction began on a new bus terminal next to the railway terminus on Zaliznychna Street. Inauguration of the new bus terminal took place on 22 May 2010. At the opening ceremony the Mayor of the city, Viktor Anushkevychus, noted that the new bus terminal was only partially completed, and for a period it would be necessary to offload passengers at the Pryvokzalna Square, which is already saturated with traffic. He also emphasised the need for another bus station on the outskirts of the city.

 Airways transportation
The city is served by Ivano-Frankivsk International Airport, which was granted international status in 1992. The airport shares its facilities with the 114 Brigade of the Ukrainian Air Force. Since 2002, the airport has been leased to the private enterprise company Yavson, and from 2005 the Public limited company Naftokhimik Prykarpattia, a (subsidiary of Ukrnafta). The contract with Naftokhimik Prykarpattia expired in 2013.

 Lodging
There are many lodging options in Ivano-Frankivsk. Ivano-Frankivsk has one four-star hotel ("Park Hotel") and three three-star hotels ("Nadia", "Auscoprut", "Pid Templem").

Routes
There also is one important regional route T09-06.

Education

The city has over 25 public schools of general education for grades 1 through 11. There are also some privately owned schools and lyceums. In addition, the city has several professional public institutes.

There also numerous sports schools: Fitness Sport Association "Ukraine" – 5 schools, MVK – 3 schools, Fitness Sport Association "Spartak" – 2 schools, Fitness Sport Association "Kolos" – 1 school, and the others.

Universities

The city has six universities, the Ivano-Frankivsk Institute of Management that is a local campus of Ternopil National Economic University, and the Ivano-Frankivsk Institute of Management and Economics "Halytska Akademia". All of those universities are state funded.
 Vasyl Stefanyk Precarpathian National University
 Ivano-Frankivsk National Technical University of Oil and Gas (University of Oil and Gas)
 Ivano-Frankivsk National Medical University
 King Daniel of Galicia Ivano-Frankivsk University of Law
 Ivano-Frankivsk Theological Academy of Greek-Catholic Church
 West Ukrainian University of Economics and Law

Culture and sports

National landmarks
 the Church of the Holy Resurrection (Greek Catholic Cathedral)
 the Church of Virgin Mary (at the moment used as museum of Sacred Art of Galicia)
 Latin Collegiate
 the Armenian church (presently used by one of the Ukrainian Orthodox Churches).
 City Brewery

Other attractions
 Market Square with the city's old town hall, today hosting an ethno-cultural museum.
 Shevchenko Park, a big park that consists of an amusement park, a big lake with swans, couple of full-size football fields, and many other interesting places which are worth a visit.
 Bily Budynok, a big white building in the middle of the city and next to the Market place. It is the main administration building of Ivano-Frankivsk and Ivano-Frankivsk Oblast. In front of the building, there are two full-size sculptural monuments to Franko and Shevchenko.
 Bazaar, a huge area that covers the old market and the new market with a couple of supermarket stores locally known as the universal stores.
  stretch (stometrivka), unofficial local name for a part of Independence Street that consists of numerous shops and is restricted to pedestrian traffic only.

Architecture
 Stanislav fortress compound and Potocki palace
 Cathedral of the Holy Resurrection, locally known as Katedra (Greek-Catholic Cathedral)
 Jesuit Kostel, the second building of Jesuits after they were forced to surrender Katedra
 Fara, also known as the Collegiate Church of Virgin Mary and Saint Stanislaus (today – the Regional Art Museum)
 Ratusha, a former city hall
 Battle of Grunwald monument – commemorating the victory of the Poland on Grunwald fields in  1410.
 Monument to Adam Mickiewicz (1930) – it was reconstructed in 1989, located in Adam Mickiewicz Square next to a regional concert (philharmonic) hall. It is the oldest surviving monument in the city and was built on 20 November 1898 (sculptor Tadeusz Błotnicki).
 Monument to Stepan Bandera and Museum of the Insurgent Army in European Square were awarded the best architectural project of 2007 designed by a local architecture company "Atelie Arkhitektury"

Theaters and Cinemas
 Ivan Franko Academic Regional Music and Drama Theater
 Mariika Pidhirianka Academic Regional Puppet Theater
 Ivan Tobilevich Ukrainian National Theater
 Regional Philharmonic Society 
 Lumiere Movie Theater (previously, Ivan Franko Movie Theater)
 Cosmos Movie Theater 
 Former
 Patriot Movie Theater 
 Shevchenko Movie Theater (previously "Pioneer")
 "Videotech"
 Gorky Movie Theater
 Komsomolets Movie Theater
 Shevchenko Movie Theater (original)
 Trembita, a summer movie theater

City parks
 Shevchenko Park
 Park of Warriors-Internationalists
 Park "Valy"
 Pryvokzalny park
 Memorial Park, near Ivan Franko Academic Regional Music and Drama Theater

Festivals
 «Sviato Kovaliv» (Blacksmiths festival)
 «Karpatskyi Prostir» (Carpathian Space)
 «Kolyada na Mayzlyakh» Christmas Festival
 «Burak Fest» Festival of Street Food 
 «Prykarpattya Honey Fest»
 «Holiday of Grapes and Wine»
 «Stanislavska Marmulada»

Night life
Bomba
Panorama Plaza
Pasage Gartenberg
eL Dorado
Deja Vu

Sports

Ivano-Frankivsk is home to a number of sports teams. Most notably, it was home to the football club FC Spartak Ivano-Frankivsk (Prykarpattya) that participated on the national level since the 1950s. Since 2007, the club only fields its youth team Spartak-93 and competes in the Children-Youth Football League of Ukraine. The former president of Spartak Anatoliy Revutskiy reorganized the local university (University of Oil and Gas) team in 2007 into the new "FSK Prykarpattia" with support of the city mayor Anushkevychus making it the main football club in the region and replacing Spartak. Previously during the interbellum period, the city was home to another football club based on the local Polish garrison and called Rewera Stanisławów (1908). That club competed at a regional level that had evolved at that period. With the start of World War II, that club was disbanded. During the Soviet period among several others there was another club "Elektron" that successfully participated at a regional level around the 1970s.

The city also is the home to a futsal team, PFC Uragan Ivano-Frankivsk, that competes in the Ukrainian Futsal Championship. They were the Ukrainian champions having won the 2010/11 season playoffs and therefore took part in the 2011–12 UEFA Futsal Cup for the first time.

The city had an ice hockey team, HC Vatra Ivano-Frankivsk, which previously played in the Ukrainian Hockey Championship.

Ivano-Frankivsk is also the hometown of Ukrainian gymnasts; one of them is Dariya Zgoba who won gold on the uneven bars in the 2007 European Championships and became a finalist on the Beijing Olympics; the other one is Yana Demyanchuk, who won gold on the balance beam at the 2009 European Championships.

Other clubs include:
 Hoverla Ivano-Frankivsk (basketball)
 Roland Ivano-Frankivsk (rugby)
 Uragan (futsal)

 Main Stadiums and Sport Complexes
 MCS Rukh, a sport complex consisting of the major arena and two auxiliary fields next to it
 Yunist Stadium (Youth)
 Hirka Stadium, property of the Ivano-Frankivsk Locomotive Maintenance Plant
 Nauka Stadium (Science), which belongs to Vasyl Stefanyk Precarpathian National University
 Stadium of Oil and Gas University
 Sport-Recreational Center "Tsunami", which contains an ice arena for the local hockey events and a waterpark

City's radio, television, press media
 Press
 "Reporter" – Ivano-Frankivsk weekly
 "Halytsky Korrespondent" – a social-political weekly
 "Halychyna" – regional newspaper
 Radio
 "Zakhidny Polyus (104.3 FM)" – city's radio
 "Vezha (107 FM)" – city's radio
 Television
 "Ivano-Frankivsk ODTRK" – regional state broadcasting company
 "3-Studia" – regional broadcasting company
 "Halychyna" – regional television

Notable people 

 Eliezer Adler (born 1866), founder of the Jewish Community in Gateshead, England
 Svetlana Alexievich (born 1948), Belarusian journalist and writer, winner of the 2015 Nobel Prize for Literature
 Yuri Andrukhovych (born 1960), Ukrainian writer
 Daniel Auster (1893–1963), Mayor of Jerusalem
 Menachem Avidom (1908–1995), Israeli composer
 John Banner (1910–1973), Austrian-American actor. Star of Hogan's Heroes
 Naftali Blumenthal (1922-2022), Israeli Member of the Knesset 
 Maxim Bugzester (1909–1978), Polish painter
 Arthur F. Burns (1904–1987), American-Jewish economist and politician
 Ana Casares (1930–2007), Polish-Argentine actress
 Zbigniew Cybulski (1927–1967), Polish actor
 Bolesław Wieniawa-Długoszowski (1881–1942), Polish general, politician and diplomat
 Albin Dunajewski (1817-1894), Roman Catholic cardinal
 Wiktor Eckhaus (1930–2000), Polish–Dutch mathematician
 Feliks Falk (born 1941), Polish film director
 Moshe Flimann (1905–1973), Mayor of Haifa
 Fritz Grossmann (1902–1984), art historian and Professor of Art History
 Ludwik Hass (1918–2008), Polish historian 
 Moses Horowitz (1844–1910), playwright and actor of Yiddish theatre
 Alfred Johann Theophil Jansa von Tannenau (1884–1963), Austrian general
 GreenJolly (active 2004–2005), Ukrainian rap band
 Tina Karol (born 1985), Ukrainian singer, actress, and television presenter
 Maria Antonina Kratochwil (1881–1942), nun beatified by Pope John Paul II who tried to save Jews during the Holocaust
 František Kriegel (1908—1979), Czechoslovak politician and physician
 Manfred H. Lachs (1914–1993), Polish diplomat and British jurist 
 Oksana Lada (born 1976), Ukrainian actress
 Chaim David Lippe (1823–1900), Austrian Jewish publisher and bibliographer
 Alfreda Markowska (born 1926), Polish-Romani woman who during World War II saved approximately 50 Jewish and Roma children from death in the Holocaust and the Porajmos genocide
 Leo Aryeh Mayer (1895–1959), Israeli scholar of Islamic art and rector of the Hebrew University of Jerusalem
 Bernard Mond (1887–1957), Jewish general of the Polish Army 
 Itzhak Nener (1919–2012), Israeli jurist
 Yevhen Nakonechny (1931–2006), Ukrainian historian, librarian, library scientist, and linguist
 Daniel Passent (1938–2022), Polish journalist
 Anastasiya Petryshak (born 1994), Ukrainian violinist
 Józef Potocki (1673–1751), a Polish nobleman, son of the Polish founder of the city
 Mikhail Prusak (born 1960), Russian politician
 Horacy Safrin (1899–1980), Polish poet, comedian, author, and translator
 Max Schur (1897–1969), physician 
 Anna Seniuk (born 1942), Polish actress
 Tryzuby Stas (1948–2007), a representative of the Ukrainian humorous original songs, bard
 Klemens Stefan Sielecki (1903–1980), Polish engineer and technical director of Fablok
 Stanisław Sosabowski (1892–1967), Polish general, hero of Arnhem
 Mordechai Surkis (1908–1995), Israeli politician 
 Gabriel Talphir (1901–1990), Israeli poet, art critic, publisher, editor, and translator
 Vasyl Velychkovsky (1903–1973), bishop of Ukrainian Greek Catholic Church
 Taras Voznyak (born 1957), Ukrainian political scientist, editor-in-chief and founder of Independent Cultural Journal
 Alexander Wagner (1868–1942), Polish chess theoretician
 Ksenia Zsikhotska (born 1989), Professional dancer

Sport 
 Yana Demyanchuk (born 1993), Ukrainian gymnast and 2009 European Champion on balance beam
 Myroslav Stupar (born 1941), Ukrainian football referee
 Vasyl Virastyuk (born 1974), Ukrainian strongman athlete 2004 World's Strongest Man

Twin towns – sister cities

Ivano-Frankivsk is twinned with:

 Arlington County, United States (2009)
 Braga, Portugal (2017)
 Chrzanów, Poland (2001)
 Chrzanów County, Poland (2016)
 Jelgava, Latvia (2007)
 Koszalin, Poland (2010)
 Lublin, Poland (2009)
 Nanning, China (2019)
 Nowa Sól County, Poland (2010)
 Ochota (Warsaw), Poland (2006)
 Opole, Poland (2005)
 Přerov, Czech Republic (2010)
 Rustavi, Georgia (2016)
 Rybnik, Poland (2001)
 Rzeszów, Poland (2000)
 Strășeni District, Moldova (2016)
 Świdnica, Poland (2008)
 Tomaszów Mazowiecki, Poland (2004)
 Trakai, Lithuania (2006)
 Zielona Góra, Poland (2001)

In February 2016 Ivano-Frankivsk City Council terminated its twinned relations with the Russian cities Surgut, Serpukhov and Veliky Novgorod due to the Russo-Ukrainian War.

Partner cities
Ivano-Frankivsk cooperates with:

 Baia Mare, Romania (1990)
 Nyíregyháza, Hungary (2004)
 Oradea, Romania (2003)
 Târgoviște, Romania (2005)

Orientation
 Local orientation

 Regional orientation

See also
 Dem'ianiv Laz

Notes

References

Sources
 "Endure, Defy and Remember", by Joachim Nachbar, 1977
 
 "False papers: deception and survival in the Holocaust", by Robert Melson, Univ. of Illinois Press, 2000. Dr. Melson is a professor of political science at Purdue, whose grandfather owned the Mendelsohn factory in Stanislawow.
 "I'm not even a grown up, the diary of Jerzy Feliks Urman", translated by Anthony Rudolf and Joanna Voit, ed. by Anthony Rudolf. London: Menard Press, 1991. 11-yr old in Stanislaw commits suicide to avoid capture by Nazis.
 "Living Longer than Hate", by C.S. Ragsdale

External links

 Local government
 mvk.if.ua – Official site of Ivano-Frankivsk
 The Regional Directorate of Statistics website
 Association of Ukrainian cities website
 General information and travel
 Site of Ivano-Frankivsk|Franyk (ua)
 Web company in Frankovsk|Frankivsk.in.ua (ua)
 Іvano-Frankivsk |Portal (ukr.)
 ifportal.net
 pravda.if.ua
 
 Local business catalog
 Maps
 Soviet topographic map 1:100,000
 2005 Ivano-Frankivsk – Satellite image
 Area map of Stanislawow, with the general shape of the major streets, showing enlarged town detail from a 1905 Austrian military map 
 History
 The Stanislau Phenomenon – How the Western Ukrainian provincial nest of Ivano-Frankivsk turned into a thriving literary metropolis and multicultural frontier between East and West. By Holger Gemba at signandsight.com
  – Transliteration of Unpublished List of Citizens Murdered by the Nazis, from documents of the Russian Commission to Investigate Nazi Crimes
 Polish historical website on Stanislawow
 Photographs of Jewish sites in Ivano-Frankivsk in Jewish History in Galicia and Bukovina
 
 Photos
 Stanislaw: virtual Ivano-Frankivs'k |spherical panoramas
 Old photos and postcards which highlight city architecture at the beginning of the 20th century
 Photos of modern Ivano-Frankivsk (from 2004)
 Photos of Ivano-Frankivsk
 
 

 
1660s establishments in the Polish–Lithuanian Commonwealth
Cities of regional significance in Ukraine
Cities in Ivano-Frankivsk Oblast
City name changes in Ukraine
Holocaust locations in Ukraine
Kingdom of Galicia and Lodomeria
Magdeburg rights
Oblast centers in Ukraine
Populated places established in 1663
Ruthenian Voivodeship
Shtetls
Stanisławów Voivodeship